1,9-Pyrazoloanthrone is a chemical compound that is a derivative of anthrone.  It is used in biochemical studies as an inhibitor of c-Jun N-terminal kinases (JNKs).

Derivatives of 1,9-pyrazoloanthrone have a variety of biological activities.  For example, 5-(aminoalkyl)amino derivatives have been investigated as anticancer agents.

Synthesis 
1,9-Pyrazoloanthrone can be synthesized by the condensation of 2-chloroanthraquinone with anhydrous hydrazine in pyridine at 100 °C. Purification is achieved via conversion to the N-acetyl derivative which is crystallized from acetic acid, followed by hydrolysis of the acetyl group with ammonium hydroxide in methanol.

References 

Aromatic ketones
Nitrogen heterocycles
Heterocyclic compounds with 4 rings
Tetracyclic compounds